Public access may refer to:

 Freedom of information laws
 Open access publishing 
 Public Access (film), 1993
 Public access computer
 Public Access T.V. (band), musical group
 Public-access television
 Public records
 Right of public access to the wilderness

See also
 Access rights (disambiguation)
 Open access (disambiguation)